WNPQ is a commercial FM radio station licensed to New Philadelphia, Ohio, United States, serving the Canton market. It broadcasts at 95.9 MHz, airing the K-Love contemporary Christian format. Previous formats include rock music in the 1980s as "Quick 96", later Top 40 hits as "Hot 95.9" and Country as "Canton Country 95.9".

The station was the FM sister station of WBTC, started by James Natoli in the name of his company, Tuscarawas Broadcasting Co. Its transmitter is located near Strasburg, Ohio.

James Natoli, 98, died Thursday evening June 1, 2017 at the Park Village Southside retirement community in New Philadelphia, Ohio. Effective March 14, 2022, Tuscarawas Broadcasting sold WNPQ to Educational Media Foundation for $850,000.

References

External links
 

Radio stations established in 1969
1969 establishments in Ohio
NPQ
Contemporary Christian radio stations in the United States
Educational Media Foundation radio stations
K-Love radio stations